Diane de France, suo jure Duchess of Angoulême (25 July 1538 – 11 January 1619) was the natural (illegitimate) daughter of Henry II of France by his italian lover Filippa Duci.  She played an important political role during the French Wars of Religion and built the Hôtel d'Angoulême in Paris.

Birth and early life
In October 1537, the eighteen-year-old Henry, who had recently become the dauphin but was not yet king, was in Moncalieri in northern Italy on a military campaign. There he had an affair with a young woman, Filippa Duci, the daughter of a lesser noble of Fossano in the Piedmont and the sister of Jean-Antoine, a page or groom in the Grand Écurie. This union produced an illegitimate daughter, born 25 July 1538 and later known as Diane de France. It is not known whether she was born at court or was brought there when still very young. At court, her care and upbringing were entrusted to Henry's mistress, Diane de Poitiers.

Diane's father treated her well: her household included a governess, tutors, maids of honor, chamber valets, and even a tailor. Her tutors turned her into an accomplished princess. She learned to write in excellent French, the proof of which can be seen in the large number letters that still survive. She also learned Italian (the second language of the court), Spanish, and enough Latin for religious ceremonies. Her artistic education was not neglected: she also learned to play lute and other instruments, and to sing.

She was not formally legitimised until much later, in 1572 (not 1547 as previously believed).

First marriage
On 13 February 1552, when Diane de France was thirteen, a contract was signed by which she married Orazio Farnese, Duke of Castro. The wedding ceremony on 15 February 1553 was attended by Orazio's brother Cardinal Alessandro Farnese and included masquerades and carnival banquets. She became a widow five months later, on 18 July 1553, when Orazio was killed while serving with French forces at the siege of Hesdin. She spent her period of mourning at the Château de Chantilly, home of Anne de Montmorency, Connétable de France, then returned to court in the service of Catherine de Medici.

Second marriage
Diane's second marriage was to Francis de Montmorency, eldest son of Anne de Montmorency, by a contract of 3 May 1557 and a ceremony that took place on 4 June 1557 at the Château de Villers-Cotterêts. They had a son, named Anne after his grandfather, born by late September 1560 but dead before 15 October.

On 22 June 1563, after the death of her father and then her half-brother Francis II, the new king, her half-brother Charles IX gave her, by lettres patentes signed at the Château de Vincennes, the Duchy of Châtellerault. The annual revenues of about 6,000 livres were meant to compensate for the gift of 50,000 écus promised for her first marriage but never paid from the royal treasury. The revenues from this duchy were far less than what she was owed. After the death of Charles, Diane became a favourite of  the new king, her other half-brother Henri III. In February 1576, he signed additional lettres patentes, giving her the lands and seigneuries of Coucy and Folembray (both in today's département of Aisne), as well as some other estates in the Bourbonnais.

Diane was widowed for a second time in 1579, after helping make her husband a leader of the politiques, a moderate Roman Catholic group in France.

Later life
In August 1582, Henry III gave her the Duchy of Angoulême in exchange for that of Châtellerault, making her Duchess of Angoulême in appanage (during her lifetime only). The new title came with increased wealth, so in 1584 she started building a new Paris residence, the Hôtel d'Angoulême (now the Hôtel Lamoignon). Construction was likely interrupted by the Wars of Religion, and only completed with a second phase of construction in 1611. 

Diane also enjoyed much respect at the court of Henry IV, King of France, and superintended the education of his son Louis XIII.

Diane died on 11 January 1619 in Paris. Her surviving letters reveal her as a woman of great courage and tolerance.

Notes

Bibliography
 Cooper, Richard (2007). "Legate's Luxury: The Entries of Cardinal Alessandro Farnese to Avignon and Carpentras, 1553", pp. 133–161, in French Ceremonial Entries in the Sixteenth Century: Event, Image, Text, edited by Nicolas Russell and Hélène Visentin. Toronto: Centre for Reformation and Renaissance Studies. .
 Knecht, R. J. (1998). Catherine de' Medici. London: Longman. .
 Lanza, Janine M. (2007). From Wives to Widows in Early Modern Paris: Gender, Economy, and Law. Ashgate Publishing. .
 Lhote, Claude; Claude Troquet (2013). Diane, bâtarde du roi, princesse de la Renaissance, preface by B. Barbiche, professor emeritus of the École des Chartes. Éditions LULU.com. . .
 Mariéjol, Jean-H. (1920). Catherine de Medicis (1519-1589) . Paris: Hachette.
 Merrill, Robert V. (1935). "Considerations on 'Les Amours de I. du Bellay'", Modern Philology, vol. 33, no. 2 (November, 1935), pp. 129-138. .
 Pébay, Isabelle; Claude Troquet (1990). "Philippe Desducs, mère de Diane de France" , Bibliothèque de l'École des chartes, volume 148, no. 1, pp. 151–160.
 Pébay, Isabelle; Claude Troquet (1992). "Les hôtels d'Angoulême sous Diane de France", pp. 88–97, in La rue des Francs-Bourgeois au Marais, edited by Béatrice de Andia and Alexandre Gady. Paris: Délégation à l'action artistique de la Ville de Paris. .
 Picot, Émile (1907). Les français italianisants au XVIe siècle, volume 2 . Paris: Honoré Champion.
 Setton, Kenneth M. (1984). The Papacy and the Levant (1204-1571). Volume IV. The Sixteenth Century from Julius III to Pius V. Philadelphia: The American Philosophical Society. .

1538 births
1619 deaths
16th-century French women
17th-century French women
Nobility from Paris
Diane de France
Diane de France
6
Dukes of Angoulême
Angoulême, Duchess of, Diane de France
French ladies-in-waiting
Daughters of kings